Pescina is a township and comune   in the province of L'Aquila, Abruzzo, central Italy. It is a part of the mountain community Valle del Giovenco.

Geography
Pescina borders on the communes of Celano, Collarmele, Gioia dei Marsi, Ortona dei Marsi, Ortucchio, Ovindoli, San Benedetto dei Marsi, and Trasacco.

Rainfall is relatively heavy, averaging  annually and occurring mostly in the late autumn. In the winter snowfall is also relatively abundant.

History

The earthquake of 1915 

The earthquake of 13 January 1915 (also known as the earthquake of Avezzano) affected the Marsica area, situated in the interior of Abruzzo. It was one of the most catastrophic earthquakes to occur in world territory, leaving 120,000 victims in Avezzano and surrounding areas. While the mainshock occurred at 7:48 AM local time and was judged to be X (Extreme) on the Mercalli intensity scale, the initial aftershock was estimated to be VII (Very strong) on the Mercalli intensity scale and was felt throughout all of central Italy.

Pescina was completely leveled by the event. The victims were about 5,000 out of a total population of 6,000. The few who survived were generally badly injured and remained homeless since all of the buildings in town were destroyed. The earthquake completely isolated the area and news of the disaster was only learned of in the late afternoon. Rescuers left on the evening of the 13th, arriving only the day after because of the impassability of the roads caused by landslides and debris.

The seismic event brought to light the lack of preparedness of the Italian state. Eminio Sipari,member of Parliament for electoral district of Pescina, protested that many victims probably would have been saved with proper precautions. The continuation of World War I, which had begun in autumn of 1914, brought troops to the region and secured the permanence of forces in the afflicted area.

The earthquake of 1915 created interest in the Appennini mountain chain which had not seen such disastrous earthquakes before 1915. Segments of the population which had no geological competence developed theories to explain the great earthquake, placing the blame on human activities in the area. In this case, it was the drainage of lake Fucino which was credited for causing the quake. However, such as the case with all other previous earthquakes, the great quake of 1915 was caused by the movement of and release of pent-up energy of an important tectonic fault.

Like most other areas of Italy, Pescina has a diaspora still extant in the New World. The families of Galli and Villanucci, which have had a presence in Pescina since at least 1880, have members in at least two American cities: Portland, Maine and Providence, Rhode Island.

Main sights

Cathedral of Santa Maria delle Grazie 

The church was built in the fifteenth century. From 1526 in the crypt houses the relics of San Berardo dei Marsi. In 1915 it was damaged by the earthquake in Avezzano, and restored after the Second World War. The church itself blends various architectural styles. The Renaissance facade is decorated with a large rose window. The base is decorated with a porch and three gates. The interior has three naves, Renaissance and Baroque, and retains some medieval frescoes. The bell tower is a large three-storey tower, which houses an ancient bell, dedicated to Saint Berardo of Marsi.

Piccolomini Tower and old village of Pescina 
The old village of Pescina was the oldest part of the old town, built in the fourteenth century. The village also had a castle, dismantled in later centuries, which today survives the ancient tower of the Piccolomini family. In 1915 Avezzano's earthquake destroyed much of the old town, the tower collapsed and most of the old church of San Berardo. Only the bell tower remained standing.

The writer Ignazio Silone set his novel "Fontamara". Today part of the old village has been partly restored and renovated. The traveller can visiting the great tower of the Piccolomini family, and the medieval bell tower of the old church of San Berardo. Under the bell tower is the tomb of the writer Ignazio Silone.

Museum "Home Ignazio Silone" 

Museum that was built in the birthplace of the writer. Home Silone was one of the few houses to escape the earthquake of 1915. The museum devoted to Ignazio Silone contains several manuscripts and original letters of the author.

Museum "Home Cardinal Giulio Mazzarino" 
Cardinal Jules Mazarin was a famous man of the Church who worked in Paris, alongside Cardinal Richelieu. His fame was such that the writer Alexandre Dumas père included it as one of the famous characters of his novels "The Viscount Brangelonne" and "Twenty Years After", stories that deal with the three Musketeers.

The original home of Mazarin was shaped like a castle, but it was completely destroyed by an earthquake in 1915. The new house was rebuilt respecting the original architectural style of the house, but has some differences. The museum contains precious memories and manuscripts of French cardinal, and houses a private collection of art baroque.

Notable people

 Andrea Zitolo, Scientist.
 Cardinal Mazarin, successor of Cardinal Richelieu to the regency of France
 Domenico Morfeo, footballer
 Ignazio Silone, author
 Michele Mazzarino, Cardinal and brother of Cardinal Mazarin
 Luciano Zauri, footballer
 Paolo Marso, Italian humanist and poet

Twin towns
Pescina is twinned with:
   Józsefváros, eight district of the city of Budapest, Hungary

References

 
Marsica